Tiv Ta'am ("Quality Taste") is an Israeli supermarket chain, notable for being the country's most prominent purveyor of pork and other products not complying with the kosher dietary laws of Judaism. Tiv Ta'am is Israel's largest producer and supplier of non-kosher meat, and is also noted for most of its branches staying open during the Jewish Sabbath and on Jewish holidays (except Yom Kippur). Some of its branches are open 24/7. As of 2020, there are over 40 Tiv Ta'am branches throughout Israel. The company is also involved in food processing and formerly in telecommunications.

History
Tiv Ta'am was founded by Kobi Tribitch and Tzachi Lipka in 1989. The company is today a national chain. In addition to the supermarkets throughout Israel, Tiv Ta'am is also involved in food processing and production, including hot dogs, chicken, fish, seafood, dried fruits, cheeses and wine, and formerly in telecommunication, which included the importing, marketing and distribution of telecommunication switchboards. In 2007 Tiv Ta'am sold its holding in the telecommunication satellite company Satcom Ltd., and in September 2008 it sold its holdings in Tadiran Telecom.

Potential sale
In June 2007 a lot of news was made and uproar among certain segments of the Israeli public, when Arcadi Gaydamak, Israeli businessman, made an offer to purchase the company and making a public commitment to turn the supermarket kosher and stop selling pork. He also said that he would make Mizra, the factory which produces pork products for Tiv Ta'am, supply chicken instead of pork.

A few days later, the deal collapsed, when it became apparent that it was infeasible to turn the supermarket kosher in addition that Kobi Tribitch, refused to knock off $10 million from the purchase price. It was infeasible to turn it kosher because Mizra had a contract with Tiv Ta'am that allowed it to sell pork, and some analysts believed Gaydamak realized most of Tiv Ta'am's customers shop there because it is not kosher.

Controversy
Controversy was created in 2006 when the Israeli investigative affairs show Kolbotek alleged that Tiv Ta'am was selling meat after its expiration date. In 2007, Kolbotek showed video of cats roaming one of Tiv Ta'am's storerooms and eating food, prompting Tiv Ta'am to run a $500,000 advertising campaign to improve its image.
Tiv Ta'am has been criticized by ultra-Orthodox Jews for selling non-kosher products such as pork, with many boycotting the chain.

References

External links
Official website

Retail companies established in 1989
Companies listed on the Tel Aviv Stock Exchange
Supermarkets of Israel
Israeli brands